Ross Lewis may refer to:

Ross Lewis (chef) (born 1965), Irish chef
Ross Lewis (photographer) (born 1943), American fine arts photographer
Ross A. Lewis (1902–1977), American cartoonist